This is a bibliography of works relating to the Aran Islands.
 

Die araner mundart, Franz Nikolaus Finck, Marburg 1899
Smuainte ar Árainn, Úna Ní Fhaircheallaigh, ar n-a cur amac do Connrad na Gaedilge, Dublin, 1902

The Aran Islands, John M. Synge, Elkin Mathews, London, 1907

Oileáin Árann, Mártan Ó Domhnaill, Muinntir C. S. Ó Fallamhain, Dublin, 1930

"History of the Aran Islands", T.V. O'Brien, 1945 (manuscript copies in Trinity College Dublin (#3198) and London Library)

The Aran Islands, Daphne Pochin Mould, David & Charles, Newton Abbot, 1972

Conamara Agus Arainn, 1880-1980, Gneithe den Stair Shoisialta, Micheal O'Conghaile, Clo Iar-Chonnachta Teo., Beal an Daingin, Conamara, 1988

Thatched Homes of the Aran Islands, An Teachin Ceanntui, Dara O'Connaola, Ceard Shiopa Inis Oirr Teo., 1988

Aran Islands
Bibliographies of countries or regions